Raja Huli is a 2013 Indian Kannada-language comedy-drama film directed by Guru Deshpande and written by S. R. Prabhakaran. Produced by K. Manju's home production, The film stars Yash in title role, along with Meghana Raj, Vasishta N. Simha, Charan Raj, Mithra and Chikkanna in supporting roles. The soundtrack and score for the film is composed by Hamsalekha. The film, which made its theatrical release on 1 November 2013, co-inciding with the Kannada Rajyotsava festival became a commercial hit at the box office, becoming Yash's 3rd consecutive hit after Drama and Googly. The movie is a remake of 2012 Tamil movie Sundarapandian.Trivia is that character named Rajahuli is played by Rangayana Raghu in Darshans film Suntaragaali (2006). Success of this movie paved a way to Yash becoming emerging star to Top star of Sandalwood

Plot
Raja Huli (Yash) is the son of a rich landlord in Mandya, leads a happy life and spends all time with his friends. Raja Huli ensures that he is always of some help to his friends. One day, he goes to ensure that his friend's love is conveyed to a girl Kaveri (Meghana Raj), who happens to be his ex-flame. As it happens, she falls in love with Raja Huli again. But trouble begins here. A murder happens and the blame falls on Raja Huli and then some twist and turns that forms the climax.

Cast

 Yash as Raja Huli
 Meghana Raj as Kaveri
 Vasishta N. Simha as Jagga
 Moni
 Chikkanna as Chikka
 Charan Raj
 Mithra as Andravi
 Ashwini as Mayuri
 Manu
 Shashikala
 M. N. Lakshmi Devi as Rajahuli's grandmother
 Sudha Belawadi as Kaveri's mother
 Nishchitha Gowda
 Hamsa
 Soujanya
 Girish Shivanna as Cheluvaraj
 Aruna Balraj as Rajahuli's mother
 Jadesh kumar
 Prakash Heggodu
 Vijay Koundinya
 Manju Mandavya as Bharatha
 Raj Kumar
 Jayaram
 Gajendra Rao
 Gandasi Nagaraj

Soundtrack

Hamsalekha composed the music for the film and the soundtracks, also writing the lyrics for five soundtracks. Lyrics for the soundtrack "Falling In Love" was penned by Yogaraj Bhat. The album has six soundtracks.

Critical reception
A critic from The Times of India wrote that "It is a romantic story very well handled by Deshapande with some great sequences". Shyam Prasad S. of Bangalore Mirror wrote that "The film is a perfect blend of entertainment and drama".

Box office
Raja Huli was released on 1 November 2013, the day of Kannada Rajyotsava and got a fantastic opening at the box office upon release. The film took the box office by storm despite facing competition from a major Bollywood release Krrish 3. According to trade reports, collections of Raja Huli was better than Krrish 3 and Tamil flick Arrambam at Bangalore Box Office. The film also did very good business on weekdays and collected approximately 5 crore Nett and 8 crore Gross at the box office in the first week. The movie, which was made with a budget of 6 crore, recovered its production cost in just seven days. Raja Huli went on to complete 119 days of successful run and collected a total of 18 crore and was performed fairly well at the box-office. Raja Huli also became Yash's third consecutive success after Drama and Googly.

References

External links
 

2013 films
2010s Kannada-language films
Indian action comedy-drama films
2000s masala films
Kannada remakes of Tamil films
Films scored by Hamsalekha
Films directed by Guru Deshpande